The University of Science and Technology – Houari Boumediene (USTHB) is a university located in the town of Bab-Ezzouar  from Algiers, Algeria. The university was designed by Brazilian architect Oscar Niemeyer and was inaugurated in 1974.

Courses offered include Computing, Pure and Applied Mathematics, Physics, Chemistry, Biology, Geology, Civil Engineering, Electronics, Information Technology, Process Engineering, and Mechanical Engineering.

USTHB was the largest university in Algeria until 2013; it has over 20,000 students. The government five-year plan aiming at raising the number of university students in Algeria from 1.2 million in 2010 to 2 million students in 2014 has led to the construction of new universities and faculties in almost every Algerian town; some universities are now larger than the USTHB in the number of enrolled students.

USTHB collaborates with western universities. Agreements exist between the faculties and their counterpart in France, Quebec Canada and other countries for the purpose of training and research. A number of Arab and African student receive grants to study in the USTHB.

Tutoring language in the university is the French language, except for the Geography curriculum that is provided in Arabic language.

Sports
USTHB has a martial arts club run by volunteers, and an agreement with the Olympic complex for the use of the Olympic swimming pool by the university students. It has a football team, and the USTHB basketball team participated in the National Collegiate Athletic competition.

Ranking
In 2010, according to University Ranking by Academic Performance (URAP), it was the best university in Algeria .

See also
List of Oscar Niemeyer works

References

External links
 University of Science and Technology, Houari Boumediene
 University of Science and Technology, Houari Boumediene 
 University of Science and Technology, Houari Boumediene 

 
1974 establishments in Algeria
Educational institutions established in 1974
Buildings and structures in Algiers Province
Houari Boumediene
Oscar Niemeyer buildings
Education in Algiers